Asaphida is a large, morphologically diverse order of trilobites found in marine strata dated from the Middle Cambrian until their extinction during the Silurian. Asaphida contains six superfamilies (Anomocaroidea, Asaphoidea, Cyclopygoidea, Dikelocephaloidea, Remopleuridoidea and Trinucleioidea), but no suborders. Asaphids comprise some 20% of described fossil trilobites.

In 2020, the superfamily Trinucleoidea was proposed to be raised to an order (Trinucleida) and removed from Asaphida.

Morphology
The Asaphids generally have cephalon (head) and pygidium (tail) parts similar in size, and most species have a prominent median ventral suture. Heads are often flat, and carapace furrows in the head area are often faint or not visible. Thoracic segments typically number 5 - 12, though some species have as few as two and some as many as 30. They also generally have a wide doublure, or rim, that surrounds the cephalon. This causes some specimens to be described as having a characteristic "snowplow" shaped cephalon. When present, eyes are typically large.

One Asaphida line, the Superfamily Asaphoidea, shows a continuous evolution of eyestalks, from individuals with stubby eyes to Asaphus kowalewskii, a trilobite with long eyestalks. This line is found in the Middle Ordovician Asery Level deposits of the Volkhov River region near Saint Petersburg, Russia. During the Ordovician, the region that is now Eastern Europe was a shallow inland sea. This eyestalk development is believed to be an adaptation to changes in turbidity during this time, with eye-stalked trilobites like A. kowalewski presumably arising in a time of increased turbidity. One thought is that this trilobite may have lain in wait for prey buried in the bottom sediment with only its periscope eyestalks protruding.

The major extinction event marking the end of the Ordovician Period reduced the diversity of all trilobite orders with most asaphid families disappearing. The only surviving asaphids were members of superfamily Trinucleioidea, and they too disappeared before the end of the Silurian Period.

Taxonomy
The following superfamilies and families are included:

Superfamily Anomocaroidea
Andrarinidae
Anomocarellidae
Anomocaridae
Aphelaspididae
Parabolinoididae
Pterocephaliidae
Superfamily Asaphoidea
Asaphidae
Ceratopygidae
Tsinaniidae
Superfamily Cyclopygoidea
Cyclopygidae
Isocolidae?
Nileidae
Taihungshaniidae
Superfamily Dikelokephaloidea
Dikelocephalidae
Eurekiidae
Loganellidae
Ptychaspididae
Saukiidae
Superfamily Remopleuridioidea
Auritamiidae
Bohemillidae
Hungaiidae
Idahoiidae
Remopleurididae
Superfamily Trinucleioidea ?
Alsataspididae
Dionididae
Liostracinidae
Raphiophoridae
Trinucleidae
incertae sedis
Rhyssometopidae (includes Mapaniidae, Plectriferidae)
Monkaspididae (Chelidonocephalidae ?)

References

 
Cambrian trilobites
Ordovician trilobites
Silurian trilobites
Trilobite orders
Cambrian first appearances
Silurian extinctions